A Lustful Mind  (Italian: Lussuria; known as Lujuria in Spain) is a 1986 Italian erotic drama film directed by Joe D'Amato.

Plot
Alessio, a young man seemingly ordinary, lives the relationships with the other sex in a traumatic way. In particular, he is persecuted by nightmares where he sees himself at the mercy of the women closest to him: his aunt, his sister and even her mother.

Cast

 Lilli Carati as Marta
 Noemie Chelkoff as Marina
 Al Cliver as Roberto
 Martin Philips as Alessio
 Ursula Foti as Alessio's sister

Release
The film grossed 308.000.000 Italian lira on its release.

See also
 List of Italian films of 1986

Notes

External links
 

Films directed by Joe D'Amato
1986 films
Italian erotic drama films
Films scored by Stefano Mainetti
1980s Italian films